Kenneth Herbert Morley Dixon CBE (19 August 1929 – 10 February 2022) was a British businessman who worked for the Rowntree's confectionery company in York, starting from 1956. He was initially responsible for the Black Magic brand of chocolates and introduced the popular After Eight mint chocolate wafers. Dixon rose to become chairman of the company in 1981. After it was taken over by Nestlé in 1988, he served on the board of that and other companies including British Rail and Yorkshire-Tyne Tees Television. He also supported a variety of educational and philanthropic institutions in York including the University and the Joseph Rowntree Foundation. Dixon died on 10 February 2022, at the age of 92.

References

1929 births
2022 deaths
Alumni of the University of Manchester
Confectioners
Harvard Business School alumni
People educated at Cranbrook School, Sydney
Rowntree's